Mexico Airplay is a weekly record chart published by Billboard magazine since 2011 for singles receiving airplay in Mexico. According to Billboards electronic database, the first chart was published on January 17, 2009. In 2011, "Give Me Everything" by Cuban-American rapper Pitbull featuring Ne-Yo, Afrojack and Nayer, reached number one. The track also peaked at the top of the American Billboard Hot 100. The same year, American performers Maroon 5 featuring Christina Aguilera also peaked at number one in Mexico and in the United States with "Moves like Jagger". In  2012, Mexican band Jesse & Joy peaked at number one on this chart and the Mexican Espanol Airplay with the song "¡Corre!" that also won the Latin Grammy Awards for Record of the Year and Song of the Year in 2012. 

Two songs performed by Barbadian singer Rihanna reached number-one, "We Found Love" and "Where Have You Been", the former also was a number-one song in the Billboard Hot 100 and its music video won the MTV Video Music Award for Video of the Year, while the latter was nominated for a Grammy Award for Best Pop Solo Performance. "Bailando" by Spanish singer-songwriter Enrique Iglesias reached number-one on the Mexico Airplay, Mexican Espanol Airplay, and the Billboard Latin Songs chart in the United States, where it spent 41 consecutive weeks at the top and won the Latin Grammy Award for Song of the Year. In 2015, "Lean On" by American electronic duo Major Lazer and DJ Snake featuring MØ peaked at number-one on the chart and was named by Spotify as the most streamed song of all time, with 526 million streams globally. By 2022, Colombian artist Maluma is the performer with the most number-one singles on the Mexico Airplay chart, with 16 chart toppers.

Number ones

Artist records

Most number-one singles

Most weeks at number-one

Notes

References

Billboard charts
Mexico Airplay